Igor Bychkov (born 7 March 1987 in Donetsk, Ukrainian SSR) is a Ukrainian-born pole vaulter who represents Spain. He competed at the 2012 Summer Olympics in London, finishing 12th in the final. He was also the first Spanish athlete in the history to compete in a World Championships Final in the pole vault (Daegu 2011) and also the first Spanish athlete to win an IAAF Challenge in the pole vault after winning in Beijing 2013.

He has won three outdoor national championships (2011, 2012 and 2013), and two indoor national championships (2008 and 2011). He has represented Spain in nine major international competitions.

His personal best jumps are 5.65 metres outdoors (Alcobendas 2013) and 5.60 meters indoors (Madrid 2014).

Competition record

References
 

1987 births
Living people
Spanish male pole vaulters
Ukrainian male pole vaulters
Sportspeople from Donetsk
Athletes (track and field) at the 2012 Summer Olympics
Olympic athletes of Spain
Ukrainian emigrants to Spain